Charles Allison (1885 – 15 March 1968) was a South African cricketer. He played in nine first-class matches for Eastern Province from 1908/09 to 1910/11.

See also
 List of Eastern Province representative cricketers

References

External links
 

1885 births
1968 deaths
South African cricketers
Eastern Province cricketers